Siah Dar may refer to:
 Siah Dar-e Kohneh
 Siah Dar-e Olya